Ryutaro Araga (荒賀 龍太郎, Araga Ryūtarō, born 16 October 1990) is a Japanese karateka. He won one of the bronze medals in the men's +75 kg event at the 2020 Summer Olympics held in Tokyo, Japan. He won the gold medal in the kumite 84 kg event at the 2016 World Karate Championships in Linz, Austria. At the Asian Games he won the gold medal in this event both in 2014 and in 2018. He is also a three-time gold medalist in his event at the Asian Karate Championships.

Career 

At the Asian Karate Championships he won the gold medal in 2013, 2015 and 2018. In 2019, he won one of the bronze medals at this event. At the 2016 World Karate Championships held in Linz, Austria, he won the silver medal in the men's team kumite event.

At the 2013 World Games held in Cali, Colombia, he won the gold medal in the men's kumite 84 kg event. In 2017, he won the silver medal in the men's kumite 84 kg event at the World Games in Wrocław, Poland.

He represented Japan at the 2020 Summer Olympics in Tokyo, Japan.

Achievements

References

External links 

 
 

1990 births
Living people
Sportspeople from Kyoto Prefecture
Japanese male karateka
Karateka at the 2010 Asian Games
Karateka at the 2014 Asian Games
Karateka at the 2018 Asian Games
Medalists at the 2010 Asian Games
Medalists at the 2014 Asian Games
Medalists at the 2018 Asian Games
Asian Games medalists in karate
Asian Games gold medalists for Japan
Asian Games silver medalists for Japan
World Games gold medalists
World Games silver medalists
Competitors at the 2013 World Games
Competitors at the 2017 World Games
World Games medalists in karate
Karateka at the 2020 Summer Olympics
Olympic karateka of Japan
Olympic medalists in karate
Olympic bronze medalists for Japan
Medalists at the 2020 Summer Olympics
21st-century Japanese people